Klan (English: Clan) is a Polish soap opera that premiered on September 22, 1997 on the public TVP1 channel. With more than 4,000 episodes spanning 25 seasons, the show is the longest-running Polish TV series. It airs from Monday to Friday at 5.50 p.m. on TVP1.

Klan revolves around the fates of the multi-generation Lubicz family from Warsaw.

Main cast members

Recurring cast members

Ratings history
During its early seasons Klan was the most popular television series in Poland. It won numerous awards for the best soap opera and best actors.

Characters
 Władysław Lubicz (portrayed by Zygmunt Kęstowicz) - husband of Maria Lubicz, father of Paweł Lubicz, Elżbieta Chojnicka, Monika Ross-Nowak, Ryszard Lubicz and Dorota Lubicz, grandfather of Agnieszka Lubicz, Aleksandra Lubicz, Paweł Lubicz Jr., Beata Borecka, Michał Chojnicki, Daniel Ross, Katarzyna Lubicz and adopted grandfather of Maciej Lubicz and Bożena Lubicz. He lived in Warsaw with his wife and children but his family comes from Lvov, Ukraine. One of his great-grandchildren, Władysław Chojnicki, is named after him. He died in June 2007.
 Maria Lubicz, née Ziętecka (portrayed by Halina Dobrowolska) - wife of Władysław Lubicz, mother of Paweł Lubicz, Elżbieta Chojnicka, Monika Ross-Nowak, Ryszard Lubicz and Dorota Lubicz, grandmother of Agnieszka Lubicz, Aleksandra Lubicz, Paweł Lubicz Jr., Beata Borecka, Michał Chojnicki, Daniel Ross, Katarzyna Lubicz and adopted grandmother of Maciej Lubicz and Bożena Lubicz. She owned a pharmacy which is now owned by her daughter Elżbieta. Maria had one brother, Stefan Ziętecki. She died on 23 August 1999.
 Elżbieta Chojnicka, née Lubicz (portrayed by Barbara Bursztynowicz) - daughter of Władysław Lubicz and Maria Lubicz, twin sister of Paweł Lubicz, older sister of Ryszard Lubicz, Monika Ross-Nowak and Dorota Lubicz, mother of Beata Borecka and Michał Chojnicki, grandmother of Jan Rafalski, Małgorzata Borecka, Antoni Chojnicki, Władysław Chojnicki and Stefan Chojnicki. She is married to Jerzy Chojnicki (they were divorced and then remarried) and owns a pharmacy called Pod Modrzewiem.
 Paweł Lubicz (portrayed by Tomasz Stockinger) - son of Władysław Lubicz and Maria Lubicz, twin brother of Elżbieta Chojnicka, older brother of Ryszard Lubicz, Monika Ross-Nowak and Dorota Lubicz, father of Agnieszka Lubicz, Aleksandra Lubicz and Paweł Lubicz Jr., grandfather of Zofia Lubicz, Julia Sokołowska and Filip Woźniacki. He was married to Krystyna Lubicz and works as a doctor in his private medical clinic El-Med. After his first wife died he got married with Jadwiga Dębińska.
 Monika Ross-Nowak, de née Lubicz (portrayed by Izabela Trojanowska) - second daughter of Władysław Lubicz and Maria Lubicz, younger sister of Paweł Lubicz, Elżbieta Chojnicka, older sister of Ryszard Lubicz and Dorota Lubicz, mother of Daniel Ross. She was married to Bernard Ross who lived in the United States. After her son Daniel was born she escaped from her husband because he was very aggressive. They divorced and Bernard died later. Monika married again, to Wojciech Nawrot who was a doctor and was El-Med's co-owner. Wojciech died a few days after their wedding. She owns a restaurant called Rosso. She was engaged to Feliks Nowak, who is now her husband.
 Ryszard Lubicz (portrayed by Piotr Cyrwus) - second son of Władysław Lubicz and Maria Lubicz, younger brother of Paweł Lubicz, Elżbieta Chojnicka, Monika Ross-Nowak and older brother of Dorota Lubicz, father of Katarzyna Lubicz, adopted father of Maciej Lubicz and Bożena Lubicz. He was married to Grażyna Lubicz. He died on 22 February 2012 after fatal fall.
 Dorota Lubicz (portrayed by Agnieszka Wosińska) - third daughter and fifth child of Władysław Lubicz and Maria Lubicz, younger sister of Paweł Lubicz, Elżbieta Chojnicka, Ryszard Lubicz and Monika Ross-Nowak. She's a nun. Dorota graduated from medical school and is a doctor. She was engaged to a man who betrayed her with her sister Elżbieta. Dorota decided to become a nun and works in Warsaw, Głoskowo or in Africa. In December 2018, the family learns that she was killed in Africa.
 Jerzy Chojnicki (portrayed by Andrzej Grabarczyk) - husband of Elżbieta Chojnicka, half-brother of Hanna Chojnicka, Oscar Chojnicki and Kamila Chojnicka, father of Beata Borecka and Michał Chojnicki, grandfather of Jan Rafalski, Małgorzata Borecka, Antoni Chojnicki, Władysław Chojnicki and Stefan Chojnicki.
 Krystyna Lubicz, née Jakubowska (portrayed by Agnieszka Kotulanka) - wife of Paweł Lubicz, sister of Lech Jakubowski, mother of Agnieszka Lubicz, Aleksandra Lubicz and Paweł Lubicz Jr., grandmother of Zofia Lubicz, Julia Sokołowska and Filip Woźniacki. She died on 29 May 2014.

External links
  
 

Polish television soap operas
1997 Polish television series debuts
Television shows set in Warsaw
1990s Polish television series
2000s Polish television series
2010s Polish television series
2020s Polish television series
Telewizja Polska original programming